Peradeniya is a suburb of the city of Kandy, about 30,000 inhabitants in Sri Lanka. It is situated on the A1 main road, just a few kilometres west of Kandy city centre. Peradeniya is supposed to take its name from pera (guava) and deniya (a plain).

Peradeniya is famous for the Royal Botanical Gardens of Peradeniya.  It is situated in a slope of the Mahaweli river and attracts many visitors from Sri Lanka as well as from abroad.

Another key attribute of this city is the University of Peradeniya. Its buildings are of mixed colonial and traditional Sri Lankan/South Asian styles, and located amongst the lush vegetation of the hill country. The Department of Agriculture is also located here. The Sri Lanka Telecom Training Centre is situated here.

West of the town lies the small historical town of Kadugannawa.

References

External links 
The University of Peradeniya
Pictures of the Campus

 
Populated places in Kandy District
Suburbs of Kandy